Edin Krupalija (born 31 January 1977) is a Bosnian bobsledder. He competed in the four man event at the 1998 Winter Olympics.

References

External links
 

1977 births
Living people
Bosnia and Herzegovina male bobsledders
Olympic bobsledders of Bosnia and Herzegovina
Bobsledders at the 1998 Winter Olympics
Sportspeople from Sarajevo